Lennox Lewis vs. Donovan Ruddock, billed as "The Fight for the Right" was a professional boxing match contested on 31 October 1992. The fight was a WBC heavyweight title "eliminator", with the winner scheduled to challenge the winner of the Evander Holyfield–Riddick Bowe championship bout held two weeks later. In addition, Lewis' Commonwealth heavyweight title was also on the line.

Background
In 1991, the number one and two ranked heavyweights, Mike Tyson and Donovan "Razor" Ruddock had two matches in order to determine who would next face  Evander Holyfield for the Undisputed Heavyweight Championship. The first match took place on 18 March 1991, with Tyson winning the bout by seventh-round technical knockout after referee Richard Steele stopped the fight as Tyson was landing a six-punch combination on Ruddock. However, Ruddock and his camp complained that Steele had stopped the fight too early and demanded a rematch with Tyson, to which Tyson's camp agreed. The rematch took place on 28 June 1991 but Tyson was again able to pick up the victory, this time by unanimous decision. With Tyson now the number one contender, a match with Holyfield was made for November of that year. Before that match could take place, Tyson was pulled out with an injury and shortly after, was convicted and sentenced to six years in prison for the rape of Desiree Washington. As such, Ruddock became the WBC's number one ranked heavyweight and was matched up against the number two ranked heavyweight, 1988 Gold Medalist Lennox Lewis, who had yet to lose a match in his professional career. The bout would take place in Lewis' native England with the winner moving on to face the winner of the Evander Holyfield–Riddick Bowe championship bout that would take place only two weeks after the Lewis–Ruddock match.

At the press conference Ruddock's promoter Murad Muhammad stated that they suspect Lewis of taking steroids prior to the upcoming fight. Lewis however neither confirmed, neither denied he did take steroids.

The fight
For nearly the entire first round, Lewis was able to keep the hard-hitting Ruddock at bay by effectively using his left jab and minimizing Ruddock's offense in the process. With 10 seconds left in the round, Ruddock ducked in an attempt to size up Lewis, but Lewis was able to land a quick, powerful right hand that dropped Ruddock to the canvas. Ruddock was able to answer referee Joe Cortez's 10 count as the round came to an end. Lewis would continue his attack early in the second round, dropping Ruddock for the second time with a combination while Ruddock was backed into the corner. Ruddock was able to get back up but was met with a furious rally from Lewis, who was able to drop Ruddock for the third time in the match with another combination. Following the knockdown, Cortez immediately stopped the fight and awarded the victory to Lewis by way of knockout.

Aftermath
Only two weeks after Lewis' defeat of Ruddock, Riddick Bowe would defeat Evander Holyfield to become the new Undisputed Heavyweight Champion. Per the agreement, Bowe was now obligated to face Lewis in his first defense of his newly won titles, but negotiations for the fight broke down after the two sides could not reach an agreement on a 90–10 split of the fights planned $32 million purse. Lewis was then offered $2.5 million to take an interim fight against an opponent of his choosing and then fight Bowe for $9 million, but that deal was also rejected. On 14 December 1992 Bowe officially vacated his WBC title at a press conference in which he tossed the belt into the trash and Lewis was named the new WBC Heavyweight champion that same day. Lewis responded to Bowe's refusal to fight him by giving him the derogatory nickname of "Chicken Bowe". Though Lewis had originally hoped to face George Foreman in his first defense, he ultimately agreed to face the WBC's number one contender Tony Tucker in his first defense, winning the bout by unanimous decision.

Undercard
Confirmed bouts:

Broadcasting

References

Ruddock
1992 in boxing
Boxing in London
Sport in the Royal Borough of Kensington and Chelsea
1992 in London
October 1992 sports events in the United Kingdom
Boxing on HBO